Callum John Smith (born 23 April 1990) is an English professional boxer. He held the WBA (Super) and Ring magazine super-middleweight titles from 2018 to 2020, and at regional level the British and European super-middleweight titles between 2015 and 2017. In 2018 he won the World Boxing Super Series super-middleweight tournament, winning the Muhammad Ali trophy in the process.

As of October 2021, he is ranked as the world's best active light-heavyweight by BoxRec, and tenth-best by the Transnational Boxing Rankings Board and the Ring magazine, as well as the eighth-best active boxer, pound for pound, by BoxRec. He is the youngest of the Smith brothers—Paul, Stephen, and Liam—all of whom are professional boxers.

Amateur career
As an amateur, Smith represented Rotunda ABC in Liverpool at domestic level, where he won the 2010 Great Britain welterweight title and 2011 Great Britain Middleweight title and GB Boxing internationally.

2010 Commonwealth Games
At the 2010 Commonwealth Games in New Delhi, India, Smith up kept family tradition by winning a silver medal in the welterweight division, following brothers Paul, who also won silver at the 2002 Commonwealth Games in Manchester, England and Stephen who claimed a gold medal at the 2006 Commonwealth Games in Melbourne, Australia. Triumphs over most notably Aston Brown of Scotland and Carl Hield of Bahrain saw Smith into the final only to be beaten by Northern Irish Paddy Gallagher.

2012 Olympic qualification tournament
Smith's bid to become GB Boxing's light-heavyweight (81 kg) representative at the 2012 Olympic Games in London ended in bitter disappointment and controversy at the final Olympic Qualification Tournament in Trabzon, Turkey.
After losing 16:14 in inexplicable fashion to Azerbaijan's Vatan Huseynli in the bout where a win would seal qualification, his hopes now relied on the man who had beat him in the previous round. As three light heavyweight Olympic places were available, the semi-finalist who lost to the eventual winner would take the third spot, however Smith's conqueror Huseynli lost to local Turkish boxer Bahram Muzaffer and Smith missed out on the third qualifying place. Soon after the tournament it was decided by AIBA that an invitational place at the Olympics was to be made available to a boxer of their choice and Smith had been short listed for the position but it was eventually decided in a cruel twist for the Englishman, that the place should be awarded to Boško Drašković of Montenegro, a man who Smith had convincingly out pointed earlier in the tournament. Drašković was eliminated from the Olympics in the first round.

Professional career

Early career
In October 2012 Smith followed his brothers into the professional ranks, under the promotional banner of Matchroom Sport, and like his siblings, would be coached by Manchester-based trainer Joe Gallagher. It was announced that he would make his debut on the undercard of Carl Froch vs. Yusaf Mack in Nottingham's Capital FM Arena on 17 November 2012. He scored a clear points win against Dan Blackwell over four rounds in his debut contest, however the victor was not entirely satisfied with his performance. The following month Smith returned to the ring for another four round contest at the London Olympia, his opponent was James Tucker and once again 'Mundo' won every round in a comfortable fashion.

In February 2013, on the undercard of Carl Frampton vs. Kiko Martinez at the Odyssey Arena in Belfast, Smith earned his first stoppage win as a professional, halting Irishman Tommy Tolan, who had previously been beaten by Smith's brother Paul, in the opening round. Smith's home debut, on the undercard of Bellew–Chilemba I, at Liverpool's Echo Arena saw another Smith win in similar fashion, again his opponent, Iain Jackson, didn't hear the bell to close the first round. Now 5–0, it was time for Smith to step up his level of opponent and be given a stiffer test than he had previously been provided, the man chosen to provide this test was Latvian Ruslans Pojonisevs, however Smith's ability and punching power may have been under-rated as he made short work of his opponent with another first-round knockout (KO). On 25 May 2013, on the Froch–Kessler II bill at London's O2 Arena, he met unbeaten Ryan Moore (3–0), Smith clearly demonstrated his superiority with an impressive fourth consecutive first-round KO.

Domestic and regional success
On 21 September 2013 Callum Smith defeated Patrick Mendy in a British record sixth first-round stoppage, and won the vacant English super-middleweight title. On 26 October Smith defeated Ruben Eduardo Acosta (27–8, 10 KOs) via sixth-round knockout to win the vacant WBC International super-middleweight title. Smiths next bout was against French boxer Francois Bastient (43–10, 18 KOs) at the Phones 4u Arena on 19 April. Bastient down in the third round, his corner threw in the towel despite him beating the count of referee Mr Finch.

On 17 May, Smith defeated Tobias Webb via 2nd-round knockout to retain the WBC International title. Smith then defeated 32 year old southpaw Vladine Biosse via unanimous decision on 12 July. Smith was ahead on all 3 judges scorecards by a long way. Smith next fought undefeated Mexican Abraham Hernandez (5–0, 3 KOs) on 16 August. This was Smiths first pro fight in the US where he won by first-round KO. On 4 October 2014 Smith knocked out Uruguayan veteran Rafael Sosa Pintos in round three. Pintos was down three times in the third round. On 22 November Smith fought in his first ever 12 round boxing match. This was also a WBC super-middleweight title eliminator, against 36 year old Serbian Nikola Sjekloca (28–2, 8 KOs). The bout went full 12 rounds, with all the judges scoring it (118–111, 118–110 and 120–108) all in favour of Smith.

Six months after his unanimous decision (UD) win over Sjekloca, Smith returned to action at the National Indoor Arena in Birmingham on 9 May 2015 against Latvian Olegs Fedotovs. Smith won via first-round TKO. On 26 June Smith returned to Echo Arena for the fifth time of his pro career to take on French boxer Christopher Rebrasse (23–3–3, 6 KOs) for the vacant WBC Silver super-middleweight title. The fight went full twelve rounds with the judges scoring it (120–107, 118–110 twice) all in favour of Smith. On 7 November, Smith took on the unbeaten Brit Rocky Fielding (21–0, 12 KOs) at the Echo Arena. Fielding was down three times prior to the stoppage in the first round 5 seconds from the bell. Smith won the vacant British super-middleweight title.

On 2 April 2016 Smith fought French boxer Hadillah Mohoumadi (20–3–1, 15 KOs) at the Echo Arena. This was a WBC super-middleweight title final eliminator and also for the European super-middleweight title. Smith won via first-round TKO.

On 16 May Smith was added to the undercard of Tony Bellew's world title shot at Goodison Park on 29 May alongside heavyweight David Price and lightweight Sean Dodd. Smith joined his older brothers Paul and Stephen on the same card. Smith defeated Cesar Reynoso, via TKO in the sixth round. Smith knocked Reynoso down three times in the contest, dropping him with left hands in round one, four and five. The first knockdown of the fight came from a short left hook to the head of Reynoso in round one. Smith dropped Reynoso with lefts to the body in round four and five.

Smith next fought on the undercard of world middleweight championship fight Gennady Golovkin vs. Kell Brook at the O2 Arena on 10 September 2016. His opponent was announced to be 21-year-old Hungarian boxer Norbert Nemesapati. Smith retained his WBC Silver title retiring Nemesapati after six rounds in their scheduled twelve-round fight. The fight stopped after Smith connected with a hard left to the body. Following the post fight interview, it was noted that Smith was the mandatory for the WBC world title, but would wait until Badou Jack and James DeGale face off in a unification fight in early 2017 before fighting the winner.

Waiting for a world title shot, Smith announced he would fight again before the close of the year. The fight would take place on the undercard of Anthony Joshua vs. Éric Molina on 10 December at the Manchester Arena. It was said that Smith would defend his Lonsdale title against mandatory challenger Luke Blackledge (21–2–2, 7 KOs). Smith successfully defended his British super-middleweight title after stopping Blackledge in the tenth round. Smith knocked Blackledge down in rounds three and eight with big power shots however, Blackledge was completely out in the tenth round with a left hook to the head which dropped him. The medical staff were brought into the ring to check on Blackledge and gave him an oxygen mask, but he was able to get up and leave the ring on his own two feet.

World Boxing Super Series

On 16 January 2017 the WBC ordered negotiations to begin for a fight between Smith and WBC champion Badou Jack (20–1–3, 12 KOs). This ruled out a potential unification rematch James DeGale was pursuing, although Jack also stated he planned on moving up to light-heavyweight. On 18 January, Jack officially vacated his WBC belt in order to move up to the light-heavyweight division. This meant that former champion Anthony Dirrell would next be in line for a world title fight. At the purse bid on 5 March, Ten Goose Boxing, on behalf of Al Haymon won with a bid of $1.6 million to control promotional rights of the fight. It was reported that Matchroom Sport, who promote Smith put in a bid of $1.2 million. Trainer Joe Gallagher confirmed the fight would take place on 9 September 2017 in Los Angeles. On 30 June, it was reported that the Dirrell camp were trying to move the location of the fight to Flint, Michigan, Dirrell's hometown. Eddie Hearn stated there was nothing in the contracts about allowing the date or venue to change, and they would stand firm on the fight taking place in Los Angeles. Hearn had hoped that Dirrell would join the World Boxing Super Series, so the fight could take place in the quarter finals, but Dirrell had already refused to enter, meaning Smith would not enter either.

On 6 July 2017, it was confirmed that Smith had joined the inaugural World Boxing Super Series, where the winner would receive a prize money and the Muhammad Ali Trophy. Due to being WBC's number 1 ranked contender at super-middleweight, the WBC had said Smith would fight for their Diamond belt in the quarter-finals. Others in the tournament included WBA champion George Groves, Jürgen Brähmer and undefeated contenders Erik Skoglund and Jamie Cox.

Smith vs. Skoglund
At the draft Gala, which took place at the famous Grimaldi Forum in Monaco, Smith, who was second-seeded, chose to fight Swedish contender Erik Skoglund (26–0, 12 KOs). Smith explained why he chose Skoglund, saying he felt Skoglund was 'stylistically the best fight' for him. On 19 July, Smith confirmed the fight would take place at the Echo Arena in Liverpool on 16 September 2017. It would also be the first fight of the series. Smith also admitted, on paper, Skoglund is the best boxer he would fight. Skoglund, who had previously fought in Sweden, Finland, Denmark and Germany, said he had no issues with traveling to England, as he was looking to prove himself. Smith dropped Skoglund in the eleventh round en route to win the fight via UD in a hard-fought exciting contest. Smith and Skoglund both showed immense respect for each other throughout the buildup and after the fight. The three judges scored the fight 116–112, 117–110 and 117–111 in favour of Smith, who advanced to the next round tournament and claimed the vacant WBC Diamond belt.

Smith vs. Holzken  
On 27 October 2017, 39 year old former world champion Jürgen Brähmer (49–3, 35 KOs) defeated American boxer Rob Brant to advance to the semi-finals against Smith, with the fight scheduled to take place in early 2018. A couple days later, Smith spoke out stating he would like the fight to take place in his home city of Liverpool, however would be open to fighting anywhere else. On 15 November, promoter Kalle Sauerland stated the fight could take place in Liverpool at the Echo Arena or Germany. Smith's trainer Joe Gallagher believed a fight in Germany would be unfair on Smith, due to Germany being known for its contentious decisions and home fighters receiving questionable wins. He later went on to state the fight should take place on neutral ground, mentioning Monte Carlo, Dublin and Amsterdam as potential locations. On 11 January 2018, the fight was finally announced to take place at the Arena Nürnberger in Nuremberg, Germany on 24 February. On 20 February, four days before the fight, German website boxen1.com reported that Brähmer had withdrawn from the tournament after failing to overcome an illness he had been fighting for a week. Comosa stated the event would still go ahead with a replacement to be announced. 34 year old Dutch kickboxer and boxer Nieky Holzken (13–0, 10 KOs), who was scheduled to fight on the undercard against Dmitry Chudinov, became the frontrunner to replace Brähmer. In a short statement, Brähmer stated he had a 'feverish infection' and apologised to his fans. Promoter Kalle Sauerland later confirmed that Holzken was the reserve fighter and would replace Brähmer and fight Smith.

Smith booked himself a place in the final of the tournament after defeating Holzken via unanimous decision. The three judges scored the fight 118–110, 117–111 and 117–111 in favour of Smith. He used his jab from the opening bell and managed to control the distance throughout the fight, also managing to land his right hand successfully on many occasions. Holzken was the faster and frequently more aggressive fighter, however Smith was far more busier in each round. Each round was the same with Smith standing straight up, jabbing constantly and throwing right hands. In the post-fight, Smith stated, "He was tough but I landed a lot jabs and my hand hurts a little bit. He was awkward, novicey but I'm not engaging in a shoot-out. I'm the better boxer." George Groves faced off with Smith immediately after the interviews took place.

Smith vs. Groves 
On 13 February, it was announced that the final of the super-middleweight tournament would take place at the O2 Arena in London on 2 June 2018. The final was made up after George Groves (28–3, 20 KOs) defeated Chris Eubank Jr. on 17 February and Smith defeating Holzken on 24 February. On 26 February, Groves tweeted that he would be going into surgery. He wrote, "We will be applying to the @WBSuperSeries for a one-month extension and are hopeful of securing this." He hoped to return to the ring by July. On 9 May, Kalle Sauerland explained that Groves could potentially be replaced by Eubank Jr. in the final of the tournament against Smith, however there would be confirmation on the final in the next 10 days. Sauerland stated, "We're working at the moment on all the solutions and scenarios, where George [Groves] is fit and where he isn't. We’re hopeful [Groves will be fit], so we'll see. You can’t start the tournament and then have the final lingering into the next tournament. I'm sorry, that’s not going to happen. We can push a month, but we can’t push it back by three or four months. We have a substitute system. We said that from day one, and that's the situation. We want Groves in the final, but if that's not possible and he doesn't declare himself fit in the next 10 days, we have to find a solution." On 28 May, it was said that Groves would be declared fit with the fight to take place on 14 July. By 6 July, there was still no date set, however according to Kalle Sauerland, the bout was expected to take place in September and likely not in the UK, with some rumours hinting there was a strong interest from Las Vegas and Middle East. Smith's trainer Joe Gallagher confirmed contracts had been signed. On 27 July, Sauerland announced the fight would take place at a 10,000 capacity arena at the King Abdullah Sports City Complex in Jeddah, Saudi Arabia on 28 September 2018. It was revealed the prize money on offer for the final was £6.1 million, with the winner taking a larger percentage.

After a tight match with the fighters level on the judges' scorecards, Smith defeated Groves via seventh-round KO. The size difference was noticeable as the fight was fought closely throughout the opening six rounds with back and forth action. Early in the fight, Groves established his jab whilst trying to avoid any power shots from Smith, whilst Smith was connecting with his right hand. Smith had more success in round three after a counter-right hand buckled Groves' legs. In round six, Smith backed Groves against the ropes and landed two strong jabs. He later landed a clean left hook which forced Groves to move back. Midway through round seven, Groves landed two body shots, however leaving himself open, Smith landed a left hook, which again shook Groves and forced him to retreat backwards. Groves was hurt at this point and Smith went after Groves against the ropes and landed numerous shots, including a hard body shot and an uppercut, ultimately sending Groves to the canvas. Groves managed to get to one knee, before referee Luis Pabon finished the ten-count, giving Smith the win. After the fight, Smith said, "It's been a long time coming, and there's times when you think, 'I've waited this long for chance. If I don't take it, when will another one come?'... I've said for a long time I'm a big believer in me own abilities. I know how good I am and I knew I'm good enough to become a world champion and become the best on the planet, and I believe I've done that." Groves made no excuses, claiming the shoulder was never an issue in the fight. He also ruled out retirement. Muhammad Ali's daughter presented Smith with the trophy. Smith claimed the WBA super-middleweight title along with the vacant Ring magazine title. Smith became the third super-middleweight after Joe Calzaghe and Andre Ward to win The Ring title. There were four official judges' scorecards. One judge had it even after six rounds at 57–57, two judges had Groves ahead 59–55 and 58–56 and one judge had Smith ahead 59–55.

Smith vs. N'Dam N'Jikam 
On 1 June 2019, on the Anthony Joshua vs Andy Ruiz Jr. undercard, Smith fought Hassan N'Dam N'Jikam, ranked No. 13 by the WBA at super middleweight. Smith dominated N'Dam from the start, dropping him once in the first round, once in the second round and a final third time in the third round. N'Dam gave it his all and even managed to beat the third count, but he didn't seem fit to continue and the referee waved off the fight.

Smith vs. Ryder 
On 23 November 2019, Smith defended his WBA and The Ring super-middleweight titles for the second time against domestic rival John Ryder, who was ranked No. 1 by the WBA and No. 4 by the WBC. Smith emerged victorious via unanimous decision, with one judge scoring the bout 117–111 while the other two scored it 116–112. The result was viewed as controversial by spectators, with many believing Ryder had won.

Smith vs. Álvarez 
On 19 December 2020, Smith attempted the third defence of his WBA and The Ring super middleweight titles against Canelo Álvarez. The vacant WBC super middleweight title was also on the line. Smith was beat down by Álvarez over twelve rounds, suffering a detached left bicep injury, and never seemed to be able to affect Álvarez with his shots. The scorecards were 117–111 and 119–109 twice in favour of Álvarez.

Light-heavyweight

Smith vs. Castillo 
Following his first professional loss against Canelo Álvarez, Smith moved up in weight and made his debut in the light-heavyweight division against former WBA title challenger Lenin Castillo, on the undercard of Anthony Joshua vs. Oleksandr Usyk on 25 September 2021. Smith defeated Castillo via a brutal second-round knockout that resulted in the latter being stretchered out of the ring.

Smith vs. Bauderlique 
On 20 August 2022, Smith fought Bauderlique in a WBC world title eliminator on the undercard of Oleksandr Usyk vs Anthony Joshua II. Smith finished the fight with a left hook at 1:53 of the fourth round in Jeddah. With this victory, Smith earned his shot at unified light heavyweight world champion Artur Beterbiev, who holds the IBF and WBO titles as well as the WBC belt.

Professional boxing record

References

External links

Callum Smith profile at Matchroom Boxing

English male boxers
Living people
1990 births
European Boxing Union champions
Commonwealth Games medallists in boxing
Commonwealth Games silver medallists for England
British Boxing Board of Control champions
World Boxing Association champions
World super-middleweight boxing champions
The Ring (magazine) champions
Welterweight boxers
Boxers at the 2010 Commonwealth Games
Medallists at the 2010 Commonwealth Games